Labina Mitevska (born 1975 in Skopje, Socialist Republic of Macedonia, Yugoslavia) is a Macedonian actress.

Career 
Mitevska began her acting career aged 19 after studying in Skopje, Denmark, and the University of Arizona. She starred in Milčo Mančevski's 1994 Oscar-nominated film Before the Rain.

Mitevska went on to play the supporting role in Welcome To Sarajevo, directed by Michael Winterbottom, and had the lead role in the Czech film Loners.

She also played the lead role in the 2006 film Warchild. She has two siblings, brother Vuk Mitevski and sister director Teona Strugar Mitevska, who directed her in the film God Exists, Her Name is Petrunija.

Filmography 
 God Exists, Her Name Is Petrunija (2019)
 When the Day Had No Name (2017)
  (2015)
 The Woman Who Brushed Off Her Tears (2012)
 Footsteps in the Sand (2010)
 9:06 (2009)
 7 Avlu (2009) .... Selma
 Ofsajd (2009) .... Milena
  (2007) .... Afrodita
 Prevrteno (2007) .... Woman in White
 L... kot ljubezen (2007) .... Maya
 Investigation (2009) .... Family friend
 Warchild (2006) .... Senada
 Tajnata kniga (2006) .... Lydia
 Kontakt (2005) ..... Zana
 Nema problema (2004) .... Sanja K.
 Bubacki (2004)
 Kako ubiv svetec (2004) .... Viola
 Weg! (2002)
 Veta (2001)
 Loners (2000) .... Vesna
 Der braune Faden (2000) .... Kyana
 I Want You (1998) .... Smokey
 Welcome to Sarajevo (1997) .... Sonja
 Before the Rain (1994) .... Zamira

External links 

 
 Labina Mitevska fan site

1975 births
Living people
Actresses from Skopje
Macedonian film actresses
University of Arizona alumni
21st-century actresses
20th-century actresses